Phylocentropus carolinus is a species of caddisfly in the family Dipseudopsidae. It is found in North America.

References

Trichoptera
Articles created by Qbugbot
Insects described in 1933